Ağcayazı, Agdash may refer to:
Aşağı Ağcayazı
Yuxarı Ağcayazı